Huntsville is a city in Alabama. It is also the name of several other places:

United States
Huntsville, Arkansas
Huntsville, Connecticut
Huntsville, Illinois
Huntsville Township, Schuyler County, Illinois
Huntsville, Madison County, Indiana
Huntsville, Randolph County, Indiana
Huntsville, Kansas
Huntsville, Mississippi
Huntsville, Missouri
Huntsville, North Carolina
Huntsville, Ohio
Huntsville, Tennessee
Huntsville, Texas
Huntsville, Utah
Huntsville, Washington
Huntsville, West Virginia

Canada
Huntsville, Ontario

Other uses
Huntsville (Norwegian band), an experimental jazz trio